Beach Ball is a 1965 American beach party movie starring Edd Byrnes and partly financed by Roger Corman.

It features appearances by The Supremes, The Walker Brothers, and The Righteous Brothers.

Tom Lisanti called it "arguably the breeziest and most enjoyable Beach Party clones. It is also the most blatant rip off."

Plot
Dick Martin manages a rock and roll group, The Wigglers (Bango, Jack and Bob). They are told by music store owner Mr Wolf that the group owes him $1,000 for their instruments and have to raise money. Martin tries to convince Susan, the credit union manager for a local college,

Cast
Edd Byrnes as Dick Martin
Chris Noel as Susan
Robert Logan as Bango
Gail Gilmore as Deborah
Aron Kincaid as Jack
Mikki Jamison as Augusta
Don Edmonds as Bob
Brenda Benet as Samantha
Anna Lavelle as Polly
James Wellman as Mr. Wolf
The Supremes (Florence Ballard, Diana Ross and Mary Wilson)
The Four Seasons
The Righteous Brothers
The Hondells
The Walker Brothers
Dick Miller as a cop
 Sid Haig as Drummer for Righteous Brothers (Uncredited role)

Production
The film was produced by Bart Patton, an actor who did some production work for Roger Corman. Corman  gave him $100,000 to make a beach party movie, of which $22,000 was already earmarked to Edd Byrnes. Patton wanted to direct but Corman did not let him having already hired comic Lennie Weinrib to make his debut as director. (Patton and Weinrib would later form a production company.) 

Stephanie Rothman worked on the movie as a production assistant, shooting second unit for the car chase scene with Aaron Kincaid. Gary Kurtz was assistant director.

In November 1964 Tommy Kirk was originally announced as male star along with Noel Edmonds. In December 1964 Chris Noel signed and Kirk was still attached. Kirk eventually dropped out of the film and was replaced by Edd Byrnes.

Noel says Byrnes was "a jerk" during the making of the film although the two of them later became friends.

The Supremes were paid $2,500 to appear in the film. The Righteous Brothers got $500 and the Hondells $400.

Reception
Corman pre sold the film to Paramount for $350,000 and it made $1 million at the box office.

See also
List of American films of 1965

References

External links

Beach Ball at BFI
Beach Ball at TCMDB

1965 films
Beach party films
1960s English-language films
1965 musical comedy films
American musical comedy films
Films produced by Gene Corman
Teensploitation
1960s American films